Lucjan Karasiewicz (born 10 July 1979 in Tarnowskie Góry) is a Polish politician. He was elected to the Sejm on 25 September 2005, getting 6844 votes in 28 Częstochowa, standing for Law and Justice. He joined Poland Comes First when that party split from Law and Justice in 2010.

See also
Members of Polish Sejm 2005-2007

External links
Lucjan Karasiewicz - parliamentary page - includes declarations of interest, voting record, and transcripts of speeches.

1979 births
Living people
People from Tarnowskie Góry
Members of the Polish Sejm 2005–2007
Poland Comes First politicians
Law and Justice politicians
Members of the Polish Sejm 2007–2011